Tayr Debba  is a small town in the Tyre District in the South Governorate of Lebanon, located 7 kilometres east of Tyre and 88 kilometers south of Beirut. Its total land area consists of 578 hectares and its average elevation is 200 meters above sea level. There are two schools, one public and the other private, in Tayr Debba which collectively enrolled a total of 607 students in 2006.

Name
According to E. H. Palmer, Teir Dubbeh means "the fortress of the bear".

History
In 1881, the PEF's Survey of Western Palestine (SWP) described it: "A village built of stone, containing 250 Metawileh, situated on a ridge surrounded by olives and fig-trees and arable land. There are three cisterns in the village."

Tayr Debba is the hometown of the Hezbollah commander Imad Mughniyeh, who was assassinated in 2008.

Notable people 

 Mohamad Haidar (born 1989), Lebanese footballer
 Imad Mughniyeh

References

Bibliography

External links
Survey of Western Palestine, Map 1:  IAA, Wikimedia commons 

Populated places in Tyre District
Shia Muslim communities in Lebanon